Maximum is MAX's debut studio album released under Avex Trax. The album consists entirely of Japanese language covers of Eurobeat songs. The album sold more than 1.2 million copies becoming the group's most successful release. It spent 4 non-consecutive weeks at #1. It is also the 15th best-selling album of 1997.

Track listing

Charts 

Album - Oricon Sales Chart (Japan)

References 

MAX (band) albums
1996 debut albums
Avex Group albums